Home Care Insight is a trade journal and website published by Promedia Publishing Ltd., based in London.

It runs annual award ceremonies for the sector. 

In July 2019 it started a campaign jointly with the  National Association of Care and Support Workers for the compulsory registration of care workers in England, as is the case in the rest of the UK.

References

Business magazines published in the United Kingdom
Professional and trade magazines
Social care in the United Kingdom